Odala  may refer to:

 Minister Odala, a character in star wars
 Odala, town in Palestinian territories
 Odala (Bahgeri Dhulbahante), a Dhulbahante subclan

See also
Khaira (disambiguation)